Bayambang, officially the Municipality of Bayambang, is a 1st class municipality in the province of Pangasinan, Philippines.  According to the 2020 census it has a population of 129,011.

It previously included the municipalities of Bautista, Alcala, Santo Tomas, Rosales, Paniqui, Gerona and Camiling. It was founded in the 16th century by Agalet, an Aeta.

Bayambang is the former seat of the 5th Capital of the Revolutionary Philippine Republic. It celebrates its Malangsi Fishtival (1st week of April, "Kalutan tan Gayaga ed Dalan"). Bayambang is the seat of the Pangasinan State University and the Colleges of Nursing and Education.

Bayambang is proposed to become the 5th city in the province of Pangasinan. An approved resolution unanimously passed by the members of the Municipal Board and the office of Pangasinan 3rd District filed a bill in Congress for the enactment of a Republic Act (RA) converting the municipality into a component city of the province.

Etymology

The name of this town according to the legend, came from the name of a plant called "balangbang" (Bauhinia acuminata) which grew in abundance during the early days. "Culibangbang" leaves were used for bulalong Iloko or sinigang. The verdant hills of Bayambang were almost covered by these plants. The people made pickles out of them. As the years passed by these plants became extinct in the vicinity but the name "Bayambang", which sounds like an echo of the plant's name, was retained as the town designation.

Others believed that the name of the town came from the once numerous "Culibangbang" trees which were misunderstood as "Bayambang" by Spanish colonizers.

Telbang (Erythrina variegata), also known as Bagbag in Ilokano and Dapdap in other dialects, was the original Bayambang. Bayambang is not a tree but actually a plant named Celosia.

History

Benaldo Gutierrez and Honorato Carungay claim Bayambang was founded in the early 16th century by an Aeta named Agalet. Bayambang was inside Inirangan and Hermosa but was re-located to Telbang and southern Poblacion in Old Bayambang.

In 1897 the first "Juez de Cuchillo" executed residents and burned houses. In November 1899 Emilio Aguinaldo designated Bayambang as the Pangasinan capital during the Japanese Regime and the seat of the short-lived Philippine Republic.  It was captured by Gen. Arthur MacArthur of Tarlac on October 12, 1899. Jose P. Rizal  visited Camiling, Tarlac's  Leonor Rivera, since it was formerly a part of Bayambang. Antonio Luna built a camp in Bayambang. Dr. Diaz became Governor under the Japanese Imperial Government and held Office in Bayambang at the Eulogio Dauz residence (junction of Quezon Blvd. And M.H. Del Pilar streets).

Bayambang was the seat of the UNESCO National Community Training Center. Gobernadorcillo Vicente Cayabyab was the first Chief Executive of the town during the Spanish Regime followed by Cabeza de Barangay Mauricio de Guzman. He was succeeded by Honorato Carungay Lorenzo Rodriguez, Julian Mananzan and later Saturnino Evaristo Dimalanta as president.

Lauriano Roldan became the first Civil Government Presidentd succeeded by Alvino Garcia, Mateo Mananzan, Gavino de Guzman, Marciano Fajardo, Agustin Carungay, Emeterio Camacho and Enrique M. Roldan.

The Mayors were Gerundio Umengan, Leopoldo Aquino Sr., Ambrosio Gloria (appointed by the PCAU of the Army), Bernardo Lagoy, Leopoldo Aquino Sr. (reelected), Eligio C. Sagun (1952-1955), Don Numeriano Castro (appointed), Salvador F. Quinto (1956-1959), Miguel C. Matabang (1960-1963), Jaime P. Junio (1964-1986), Feliciano Casingal Jr. (OIC), Don Daniel Bato (OIC), Domingo Tagulao, Calixto B. Camacho, Leocadio C. De Vera Jr and Engr. Ricardo M. Camacho.

Dr. Cezar T. Quiambao is the incumbent Municipal Mayor.

On April 5, 2014, in celebration of its 400th anniversary, Bayambang was declared winner of the Guinness World Record for the longest barbecue grill. Turkey's 6.116-kilometerlong grill record was exceeded by the eight-kilometer interconnected grill pads which simultaneously grilled 24,000 kilos of tilapia.

Proclamation No. 131 (Office of the President of the Philippines on March 24, 2011) has declared every 5th day of April as a Non-Working Day in Bayambang.

Cojuangco claim

The Cojuangco's Central Azucarera de Tarlac Realty Corporation (CAT) claims ownership of 386.8-hectare estate in 12 barangays in Bayambang, including the site of the 289-hectare Camp Gregg Military Reservation (declared on October 13, 1903, by the US colonial government, turned over to the Philippines on March 27, 1949, and particularly to the Bureau of Lands on September 29, 1949). The Alyansa ng mga Magbubukid sa Gitnang Luson (AMGL, Peasant Alliance in Central Luzon) opposed the Cojuancos.

Cityhood

House Bill No. 8826 was filed March 1, 2021, for the conversion of the municipality of Bayambang into a component city in the province of Pangasinan. The bill is currently pending with the committee on local government since March 2, 2021.

Geography

Bayambang is bounded on the north by Malasiqui, Camiling on the south, Bautista on the east and Urbiztondo on the west. Bayambang is the southernmost town in the province of Pangasinan. It is the gateway to Tarlac Province.

The town's terrain varies from rolling hills to plains. The climate is marked by a wet season from June to October and a dry season from November to May.

Land area: 16,800 hectares
Total Agricultural Area: 12,225 hectares
Total Residential Area: 278 hectares
Total Commercial Area: 9.5 hectares
Total Institutional Area: 68 hectares
Forest reserve & Wild Parks: 2,059 hectares
Total Industrial Area: 15.8 hectares
Open Space: 2,134.7 hectares

Barangays

Bayambang is politically subdivided into 77 barangays, 11 of which are urban barangays and 66 are rural barangays. Barangays are headed by elected officials called Barangay Captain and the Barangay Council, whose members are called Barangay Councilors. All are elected every three years.

 Alinggan
 Amanperez
 Amancosiling Norte
 Amancosiling Sur
 Ambayat I
 Ambayat II
 Apalen
 Asin
 Ataynan
 Bacnono
 Balaybuaya
 Banaban
 Bani
 Batangcaoa
 Beleng
 Bical Norte
 Bical Sur
 Bongato East
 Bongato West
 Buayaen
 Buenlag 1st
 Buenlag 2nd
 Cadre Site
 Carungay
 Caturay
 Darawey (Tangal)
 Duera
 Dusoc
 Hermoza
 Idong
 Inanlorenza
 Inirangan
 Iton
 Langiran
 Ligue
 M. H. del Pilar
 Macayocayo
 Magsaysay
 Maigpa
 Malimpec
 Malioer
 Managos
 Manambong Norte
 Manambong Parte
 Manambong Sur
 Mangayao
 Nalsian Norte
 Nalsian Sur
 Pangdel
 Pantol
 Paragos
 Poblacion Sur
 Pugo
 Reynado
 San Gabriel 1st
 San Gabriel 2nd
 San Vicente
 Sancagulis
 Sanlibo
 Sapang
 Tamaro
 Tambac
 Tampog
 Tanolong
 Tatarac
 Telbang
 Tococ East
 Tococ West
 Warding
 Wawa
 Zone I (Poblacion)
 Zone II (Poblacion)
 Zone III (Poblacion)
 Zone IV (Poblacion)
 Zone V (Poblacion)
 Zone VI (Poblacion)
 Zone VII (Poblacion)

Climate

Demographics

Literacy rate: 92%
Annual growth rate: 2.6%
Per-capita income: PhP26,182.00
Primary livelihood: farming, fishing

Economy

Government
In accordance with the Local Government Code, Bayambang belongs to the third congressional district in the province of Pangasinan. It is governed by a mayor designated as its local chief executive and by a municipal council as its legislative body.  The mayor, vice mayor and councilors are elected directly by the people via an election held every three years.

Elected officials

Culture

Binasuan is a colorful and lively dance from Bayambang which illustrates the balancing skills of the dancers.  The dancers gracefully maneuver glasses half-filled with rice wine which whirl and roll on the floor.

Fish "Buro" is originally made in barangay Bongato. This fermented rice delicacy is made of steamed rice, salt and freshwater fish (either carp, catfish, eel, gurami or "dalag"). Rice Crackers are made in barangay Sangcagulis and has become a popular merienda among the locals.

Tourism

On November 27, 2012, a half-million people witnessed the malangsi-fish festival including the "kalutan ed dalan" street grilling party. Pista’y Baley's theme is "Unified Bayambang, Progressive Bayambaguenos." Bayambang attractions include:

The Farmers parade displayed and corn husk products.
Bayambang District Hospital
Drum Corp Philippines (27th Lancers)
Northern Plains Mansions
CSI and Royal Malls
Agno River Flood Control Project, Bacnono
Rock Island Resort
Mangabul lake
St. Vincent Ferrer Parish Church
St. Vincent Ferrer Statue

Gallery

References

External links

 
 Municipal Profile at the National Competitiveness Council of the Philippines
 Bayambang at the Pangasinan Government Website 
 Local Governance Performance Management System
 [ Philippine Standard Geographic Code]
 Philippine Census Information

Municipalities of Pangasinan
Populated places on the Agno River